Terrence Leslie Parmenter (born 21 October 1947) is an English former professional footballer. He played for Fulham, Orient and Gillingham between 1964 and 1972.

References

1947 births
Living people
English footballers
Gillingham F.C. players
Leyton Orient F.C. players
Fulham F.C. players
Footballers from Romford
Association football fullbacks
Association football wingers